Destroy Build Destroy is an American live action reality series on Cartoon Network hosted by Andrew W.K. It was a game show, in which two teams destroyed a random object and built vehicles from it, and then the winners destroyed the losers' creation. The series originally premiered as part of a line of live-action reality series called CN Real, which aired in 2009. The series premiered on June 20, 2009, and ended its run on September 21, 2011.

Destroy Build Destroy is one of only two shows from the CN Real block (the other being Dude, What Would Happen) to have been renewed for additional seasons, as the other CN Real shows had already been cancelled earlier, due to critically negative reception.

Plot
Destroy Build Destroy is a game show in which two groups (a "green or blue" team and an "orange or yellow" team, usually grouped by theme such as common interests) of three teenage contestants destroy various objects, then build vehicles out of the wreckage to compete in some kind of challenge. The show features high powered explosives, rocket launchers, bazookas, and other destructive tools. The winning team gets $3,000 and would get to destroy the losers' creation. However, if a tie occurs by the end of the final round, resulting in neither team winning, both vehicles are destroyed.

Development
The show launched on June 20, 2009, in Carver, Massachusetts, as part of a new Cartoon Network programming block named CN Real.

Destroy Build Destroy was produced by  Mess Media in association with Idiot Box Productions. The executive producers are Dan Taberski and Scott Messick.

The second season of the show premiered on November 4, 2009, and ranked #1 in its timeslot among boys 6–11 on all television with a total of 2.1 million watching each episode.

Destroy Build Destroy was listed as one of the returning shows on Cartoon Network for 2010–2011 television season. The third season began airing on October 6, 2010.

A fourth season was ordered and aired from June to September 2011.

Episodes

Series overview

Season 1 (2009)

Season 2 (2009–10)

Season 3 (2010)

Season 4 (2011)

References

External links
 

2000s American game shows
2000s American reality television series
2009 American television series debuts
2010s American game shows
2010s American reality television series
2011 American television series endings
Cartoon Network original programming
English-language television shows